The Aerobalistic Range Association (ARA) is a nonprofit organization for facilities engaged in research and development using guns and related launchers.

Purpose
The organization was formed to share information about facility design, instrumentation development and range operations.  The organization holds a yearly meeting, usually at a location near an active test facility.  Members are encouraged to present at least one technical paper per meeting.

Student outreach
The ARA has recently developed a student outreach program aimed at promoting ballistic research in the early stages of career development. A student research paper contest has been established which provides cash stipends (currently $1,000) for winners plus invitations for winners to attend ARA meetings to present their papers.

See also
 Ballistics
 AEDC Range G
 AEDC Ballistic Range S-3
 Ames Research Center

References

External links
 Aeroballistic Range Association (official)

Trade associations based in the United States
Ballistics
Organizations established in 1961